Probuda Ridge (‘Hrebet Probuda’ \'hre-bet pro-'bu-da\) is the  long and  wide side ridge descending from Mount Anderson north-northeastwards towards Mount Todd in north-central Sentinel Range, Ellsworth Mountains in Antarctica.  The ridge features Eyer Peak, Mount Press and Mount Todd, and surmounts Embree Glacier to the west and north, Patleyna Glacier to the northeast, and Ellen Glacier and its tributary Fonfon Glacier to the southeast.  Linked to Bangey Heights to the northeast by Chepino Saddle.  The ridge's summit Mount Press was first ascended by the American Jed Brown and the Chileans Camilo Rada and Maria Paz 'Pachi' Ibarra on 31 December 2006.

The ridge is named after the settlement of Probuda in Northeastern Bulgaria.

Location
US mapping in 1961, updated in 1988.

Maps
 Vinson Massif.  Scale 1:250 000 topographic map.  Reston, Virginia: US Geological Survey, 1988.
 Antarctic Digital Database (ADD). Scale 1:250000 topographic map of Antarctica. Scientific Committee on Antarctic Research (SCAR). Since 1993, regularly updated.

Notes

References
 Bulgarian Antarctic Gazetteer. Antarctic Place-names Commission. (details in Bulgarian, basic data in English)
 Probuda Ridge. SCAR Composite Gazetteer of Antarctica

External links
 Probuda Ridge. Copernix satellite image

Ridges of Ellsworth Land
Bulgaria and the Antarctic